The Brazilian horned frog (Ceratophrys aurita) is a species of frog in the family Ceratophryidae.
It is endemic to Brazil.
Its natural habitats are subtropical or tropical moist lowland forest, freshwater marshes, intermittent freshwater marshes, and ponds.

Lifespan
Brazilian horned frogs live up to 15 years although it isn't confirmed.

References

Ceratophrys
Endemic fauna of Brazil
Amphibians of Brazil
Amphibians described in 1823
Taxonomy articles created by Polbot